William Hammond (25 October 1887 – 16 February 1919), nicknamed "Chock", was a former Australian rules footballer who played with Collingwood in the Victorian Football League (VFL).

Family	
The son of Thomas Hammond, and Ann Hammond, née Williams, Billy Hammond was born on 25 October 1887. Two of his brothers, Jack Hammond (1884-1971), and Charlie Hammond (1886-1936) also played VFL football.

He married Ellen Irvine in 1911.

Death
He died as an inpatient at the Melbourne's special "Spanish flu" hospital that had been set up in the Royal Exhibition Building on 16 February 1919.

Notes

External links 
 
 
 Billy Hammond's profile at Collingwood Forever

1887 births
1919 deaths
Australian rules footballers from Melbourne
Collingwood Football Club players
Deaths from Spanish flu
People from Collingwood, Victoria